Roofing slates are stone slabs made out of slate, which are used as roofing tiles. They are the primary product of the slate industry.

See also 
 Slate#Slate in buildings
 Slate industry
 Stone slabs#In construction
 Roofing material
 List of commercially available roofing materials

Roofs
Stone buildings
Slate